NBC Austin may refer to:

KXAN in Austin, Texas
KTTC in Austin, Minnesota